Ersen ve Dadaşlar was a Idealistic region for Turkish folk music created by Ersen Dinleten, and was popular in the 1970s Anatolian rock scene. Ersen Dinleten started to play with the band called "Kardaşlar". At first they called themselves "Ersen ve Kardaşları". After releasing two singles, they decided to change their band's name to "Ersen ve Dadaşlar" referring to the dadaist art culture which was popular in Erzurum at that time. They effectively mixed the sound of classic psychedelic rock with traditional Turkish folk music and Arabesque Music became one of the first proponents of the Anatolian rock genre.

References 

Folk rock groups
Psychedelic folk groups
Turkish rock music groups